Sacred Heart of Jesus Churches (Bethlehem Church) is a historic church located on OH-61 in Bethlehem, Sharon Township, Richland County, Ohio.

The cornerstone was laid in 1892 and the church was dedicated in 1895.  It was added to the National Register in 1986.

In 1967, the church was adopted into the mission of the parish of Shelby, OH; however, the following year the parish center was relocated to Bethlehem as its center of operations, where it remains today.

References

Roman Catholic churches completed in 1853
Churches in the Roman Catholic Diocese of Toledo
Churches on the National Register of Historic Places in Ohio
Gothic Revival church buildings in Ohio
Churches in Richland County, Ohio
National Register of Historic Places in Richland County, Ohio
19th-century Roman Catholic church buildings in the United States